This is a list of all weapons ever used by the Australian Army. It will be organised by era.

All past weapons 

 Historical weaponry of the Australian Army

World War II 

 List of Australian military equipment of World War II

Modern day 

 List of equipment of the Australian Army

References

Military weapons of Australia
Weapons